is a Japanese footballer currently playing as a right back for Sagan Tosu.

Career statistics

Club
.

Notes

References

External links

1996 births
Living people
Sportspeople from Kobe
Association football people from Hyōgo Prefecture
Nippon Sport Science University alumni
Japanese footballers
Association football defenders
Japan Football League players
J1 League players
J3 League players
FC Imabari players
Sagan Tosu players